Brown Square is a small green space in downtown Newburyport, Massachusetts.

It is named for New England merchant, Moses Brown (1742–1827), who lived in Brown Square House adjacent to the square. There were several anti-slavery gatherings in the square.
The square has a memorial statue to William Lloyd Garrison.

References

External links 
Moses Brown Papers at Baker Library Historical Collections, Harvard Business School

Parks in Essex County, Massachusetts
Buildings and structures in Newburyport, Massachusetts